Moultonborough is a town in Carroll County, New Hampshire, United States. The population was 4,918 at the 2020 census, up from 4,044 at the 2010 census. Moultonborough is bounded in large part by Lake Winnipesaukee in the southwest and to a lesser extent by Squam Lake in the northwest corner. The town includes the census-designated place of Suissevale and the community of Lees Mill.

History

The first European settlers were grantees from Hampton, New Hampshire, among whom were at least sixteen Moultons, giving the town its name. The first recorded town meeting took place on March 31, 1777, at which Jonathan Moulton was elected town clerk, among other officials elected that day. The town was incorporated on November 27, 1777. Colonel Moulton (later a brigadier general) was considered to be one of the richest men in the province at the start of the American Revolution. Moultonborough was chartered in 1763 by colonial Governor Benning Wentworth, and at the time was described as being near the "Winnepisseoky Pond". It was officially incorporated in 1777.

Moultonborough is home to the "Castle in the Clouds", an estate set in the Ossipee Mountains. Thomas Gustave Plant made a fortune manufacturing shoes, bought  and hired the Boston architectural firm of J. Williams Beal & Sons to design "Lucknow", a stone mansion built between 1913 and 1914. The property, with sweeping views of Lake Winnipesaukee, is a popular tourist attraction.

Geography
A large portion of the town is located along Lake Winnipesaukee, the largest lake in New Hampshire. Moultonborough Bay, an  arm of the lake, extends from the southern corner of the town towards the center of the town. Moultonborough Neck forms a peninsula between Moultonborough Bay and Center Harbor to the southwest. Long Island, the largest island in Lake Winnipesaukee, is connected to Moultonborough Neck by a bridge. The community of Suissevale, a census-designated place, occupies part of the northeast shore of Moultonborough Bay. Inland from Winnipesaukee, Lake Kanasatka is in the west part of the town. Red Hill, elevation , is in the northwest. Mount Shaw, elevation , part of the Ossipee Mountains and the highest point in Moultonborough, is in the east.

Route 25 is a major east-west highway in the state connecting Meredith and Plymouth to the west with Ossipee, New Hampshire and Portland, Maine to the east. Route 109, a local road, proceeds southeast towards Wolfeboro and northwest to Center Sandwich.

Adjacent municipalities
 Sandwich, New Hampshire (north)
 Tamworth, New Hampshire (northeast)
 Ossipee, New Hampshire (northeast)
 Tuftonboro, New Hampshire (east)
 Gilford, New Hampshire (southeast)
 Meredith, New Hampshire (south)
 Center Harbor, New Hampshire (west)
 Holderness, New Hampshire (west)

Demographics

As of the census of 2000, there were 4,484 people, 1,884 households, and 1,377 families residing in the town. The population density was 74.9 people per square mile (28.9/km2). There were 4,523 housing units at an average density of 75.6 per square mile (29.2/km2). 

The racial makeup of the town was:
98.48% White
0.13% African American
0.22% Native American
0.56% Asian
0.02% from other races
0.58% from two or more races
Hispanic or Latino of any race were 0.62% of the population.

There were 1,884 households, out of which:
25.7% had children under the age of 18 living with them
63.7% were married couples living together
6.0% had a female householder “with no husband present”
26.9% were non-families
23.7% of all households were made up of individuals
9.8% had someone living alone who was 65 years of age or older.

The average household size was 2.36 and the average family size was 2.77.

Age demographics:
21.1% under the age of 18
4.1% from 18 to 24, 
22.3% from 25 to 44
32.6% from 45 to 64
19.9% who were 65 years of age or older
The median age was 47 years.

For every 100 females, there were 97.6 males. For every 100 females age 18 and over, there were 96.6 males.

The median income for a household in the town was $45,050, and the median income for a family was $51,729. Males had a median income of $34,236 versus $25,332 for females. The per capita income for the town was $25,733. About 3.2% of families and 4.0% of the population were below the poverty line, including 3.3% of those under age 18 and 2.6% of those age 65 or over.

Education

The Moultonborough School District serves the town of Moultonborough. The district consists of Moultonborough Academy and Moultonborough Central School. Moultonborough Academy is the middle and high school, educating students in grades seven through twelve. The school is located off Blake Road just south of the village of Moultonborough. The Moultonborough Central School, which is located on NH Route 25 near the academy, serves grades K–6.

Sites of interest

 Castle in the Clouds
 Geneva Point Center
 Moultonborough Town House

Notable people 

 Benning M. Bean (1782–1866), US congressman
 Jonathan Moulton (1726–1787), Revolutionary War era colonel
 Thomas Gustave Plant (1859–1941), industrialist
 Claude Rains (1889–1967), actor; buried at Red Hill Cemetery
 John M. True (1838–1921), Wisconsin politician
 John Greenleaf Whittier (1807–1892), poet (summer resident)

References

External links
 
	
 
 Moultonborough Public Library
 Moultonborough School District
 New Hampshire Economic and Labor Market Information Bureau Profile

	

 
Towns in Carroll County, New Hampshire
Populated places established in 1777
Populated places on Lake Winnipesaukee
Towns in New Hampshire